Michael Downs Bradbury (born 1969) is an American college basketball coach who is the current head coach of the New Mexico Lobos women's basketball team.

Coaching history
Bradbury served as an assistant coach at Xavier from 2002 until 2007, Cincinnati from 1996 until 2002, and VCU from 1995 until 1996 after beginning his career as an assistant coach at ETSU from 1994 until 1995. He spent the 1991–92 and 1992–93 seasons as a student assistant coach at Chattanooga before his first full-time assistant coaching assignment.

From 2007 to 2010, Bradbury led Morehead State to a 50–44 record over the course of three seasons, including a 22–11 record and a bid to the WBI in his final season as head coach.  The 22-win mark set the school's NCAA-era record for victories in a season, and the 14–4 conference mark in the same year set the school's  single season conference wins record and was also the highest conference winning percentage in a season in school history.

At Wright State from 2010 to 2016, Bradbury had five seasons with 20 or more wins and led the school to its first NCAA Tournament appearance in 2014, in addition to WBI appearances in 2011 and 2012 and WNIT appearances in 2015 and 2016.

On March 31, 2016, New Mexico hired Bradbury as head women's basketball coach. In Bradbury's first season in 2016–17, New Mexico went 15–15, including 10–8 in Mountain West Conference (MW) games. Bradbury followed with two consecutive seasons with 20 or more wins and appearances in the Women's National Invitation Tournament (WNIT) as New Mexico went 25–11 in 2017–18 and 24–7 in 2018–19 and qualified for the third round of the 2018 WNIT and first round of the 2019 WNIT. New Mexico freshman guard Jayla Everett won MW Freshman of the Year honors in 2019.

The 2019–20 season began with high expectations, as the MW coaches' preseason poll picked New Mexico to finish second in the conference standings. Despite a 9–4 start to the season, New Mexico finished with a losing 15–17 record and tied for ninth in the conference standings with a 6–12 conference record. In mid-January 2020, Everett left the team and announced her intention to transfer. Shortly after Everett left the team, two former players went on the record with television station KRQE with allegations that Bradbury was verbally abusive. However, eleven other former players responded by posting an open letter on Twitter stating in part: "There was no mental or emotional abuse. We unequivocally deny these claims and fully support Mike Bradbury and the whole staff."

Personal life
Bradbury was born in Chattanooga, Tennessee. He is married and has two sons, Alex and Chris, and a daughter, Sena Nicole.  Sena was adopted from Ethiopia in April 2010, shortly after Bradbury accepted the head coaching position at Wright State.

Head coaching record
Sources:

References

1969 births
Living people
American women's basketball coaches
Basketball coaches from Tennessee
Cincinnati Bearcats women's basketball coaches
East Tennessee State Buccaneers women's basketball coaches
Morehead State Eagles women's basketball coaches
New Mexico Lobos women's basketball coaches
Sportspeople from Chattanooga, Tennessee
University of Tennessee at Chattanooga alumni
VCU Rams women's basketball coaches
Wright State Raiders women's basketball coaches
Xavier Musketeers women's basketball coaches